Campiglossa brunneimacula is a species of tephritid or fruit flies in the genus Campiglossa of the family Tephritidae.

Distribution
The species is found in New Guinea.

References

Tephritinae
Insects described in 1988
Diptera of Australasia